Central United Football Club is an amateur association football club based in Sandringham, Auckland, New Zealand who complete in the NRFL Northern Conference.

The team was officially called Central Soccer Club until 1996 when it changed its name to "Central United Football Club".

History
Following a restructure of New Zealand's national league system their spot in the Northern League was taken by sister club Auckland City FC ahead of the 2021 season  they subsequently entered the NRF Championship in 2022.

Performance in OFC competitions

Honours

New Zealand National Soccer League
Champions (2): 2001, 1999
NRFL Premier
Champions (4): 2004, 2007, 2008, 2016
NRF Championship
Champions (1): 2022
Chatham Cup
Champions (5): 1997, 1998, 2005, 2007, 2012

References

External links
Official Website
The Ultimate New Zealand Soccer Website

Association football clubs in Auckland
Association football clubs established in 1962
1962 establishments in New Zealand